National Folk Dance Ensemble of Croatia LADO was founded in 1949 in Zagreb, SR Croatia, SFRY as a professional national ensemble. LADO represents the rich and diverse regional musical and choreographic traditions of Croatia. It has been called Croatia's most successful "cultural export product".

The ensemble consists of 37 dancers who also sing while they perform, and a group of 15 musicians who play traditional and classical instruments. LADO has had numerous famous Croatian ethnographers and choreographers, music arrangers, and folklorists work with them.

History
The LADO dance ensemble was founded on 11 November 1949 by Founding Artistic Director and Choreographer Zvonko Ljevaković, thanks in part to a grant from the government of the People's Republic of Croatia under the name Državni zbor narodnih plesova i pjesama (DZNPiP). Its mission was to find and collect samples of the rich Croatian music and dance traditions.

A women's choir consisting of LADO members named  was informally split off the main LADO ensemble in 1965 by Zvonko Ljevaković and Božo Potočnik and continued to work independently of LADO until 2003. Ladarice worked on preserving traditional folk songs and built an extensive repertoire of their own, especially with their work on the Yugoslav Partisan combat songs.

Awards
Throughout the years the LADO ensemble has won numerous national and international awards and competitions. In 1954 they won first place at the Llangollen International Musical Eisteddfod in Llangollen, Great Britain. Afterwards, they won awards in various competitions in Zagreb and Cork, Ireland, as well as honorary awards from Santiago, Punta Arenas, Antofagasta, Los Angeles, Frankfurt, and the key to the city of Cleveland.

2002 - LADO represented Europe at the sixth World Symposium on Choral Music in Minneapolis, United States.
2003 - Winners of the Orlando Award at the 54th annual Dubrovnik Summer Festival.
2004 - Winners of the Ivan Lukačić Award at the 34th annual Varaždin Baroque Evenings.
2006 - Winners of INA award for promoting Croatian culture

Discography

Albums
 1987 - Narodne pjesme i plesovi sjeverne Hrvatske
 1994 - Telo Kristuševo, Narodi se mladi kralj'
 1994 - Kalvarija 1998 - Iz Kajkavskih krajeva 1998 - Iz Kajkavskih krajeva vol.2 1998 - Iz Hrvatske narodne glazbene riznice vol.1 1999 - Kolo igra, tamburica svira vol.1 1999 - Kolo igra, tamburica svira vol.2 1999 - O vreme prelubleno -
 2000 - Na moru i kraju -
 2000 - U društvu svirača vol.1 2001 - Najljepše Božične pjesme 2001 - U društvu svirača vol.2 2001 - Na zelenom travniki 2002 - Raspelo 2003 - Preveliku radost navišćujem vama 2003 - LADO electro 2004 - Zorja moja zorja - Anđela Potočnik 2004 - Božić u svijetu 2005 - Iz Hrvatske narodne glazbene riznice vol.2'
 2006 - Kalvarija
 2007 - Polke i drmeši
 2007 - Tete Liza i Lado
 2009 - Janja - Niz Muru i Dravu

DVD
 2005 - Lado in concert
 2006 - Veronika

See also
Croatian dances

References

Sources

External links
 

Lado
Lado